Creag Ghuanach (621 m) is a mountain in the Grampian Mountains of Scotland. It is located in Lochaber, at the southern head of Loch Treig.

A small but very craggy peak, Creag Ghuanach rises steeply from the Loch below. The nearest village is Roybridge several miles to the north.

References

Marilyns of Scotland
Grahams
Mountains and hills of Highland (council area)